This is a list of Russian football transfers in the summer transfer window 2008 by club. Only transfers of the 2008 Russian Premier League are included.

Premier League

FC Zenit St. Petersburg

In:
 

Out:

FC Spartak Moscow

In:
 

Out:

PFC CSKA Moscow

In:
 

Out:

FC Moscow

In:
 

Out:

FC Saturn Moscow Oblast

In:
 

Out:

FC Dynamo Moscow

In:
 

Out:

FC Lokomotiv Moscow

In:
 

Out:

FC Amkar Perm

In:
 

Out:

FC Khimki

In:
 

Out:

FC Rubin Kazan

In:
 

Out:

FC Tom Tomsk

In:
 

Out:

PFC Spartak Nalchik

In:
 

Out:

FC Krylia Sovetov Samara

In:
 

Out:

FC Luch-Energiya Vladivostok

In:
 

Out:

FC Shinnik Yaroslavl

In:
 

Out:

FC Terek Grozny

In:
 

Out:

See also
 Football in post Soviet Russia

References

Transfers
2008
Russia